Turuberan was the fourth Armenian region that was part of the ancient Kingdom of Armenia from 189 BC to 387 AD. Then it was part of the Sassanid Empire, Byzantine Empire, Arab Caliphate, medieval Kingdom of Armenia, Zakarian Armenia, various Turco-Mongol states, Safavid Empire, and finally the Ottoman Empire. A very large Armenian population remained until the Armenian genocide in 1915. Currently it is situated in Turkey's south-east.

Divisions

It had 16 cantons:
 Khouyt
 Aspakunyats Dzor
 Taron
 Ashmunik
 Mardaghi
 Dastavork
 Tvaratsatap
 Dalar
 Hark
 Varazhnunik
 Bznunik
 Yerevark
 Kajberunik or Aghiovit
 Apahunik
 Koro Gavar
 Khorkhorunik

See also
List of regions of old Armenia
Kingdom of Armenia (antiquity)

References 

Provinces of the Kingdom of Armenia (antiquity)
History of Muş Province